Kempegowda Institute of Medical Sciences is a medical college in the Indian state of Karnataka, affiliated to the Rajiv Gandhi University of Health Sciences, Jayanagar, Bangalore.

History
Kempegowda Institute of Medical Sciences was established in 1980 by the Vokkaligara Sangha. The Vokkaligara Sangha took a formal decision in 1979 to start a medical college from the year 1980–81 and applied for permission to the registrar, Bangalore University.

On 30 November 1980 the Hon'ble Chief Minister Shri. R Gundu Rao laid the foundation stone of the Kempegowda Institute of Medical Sciences and Hospital in the premises of the Sangha and announced the grant of vacant land in Banashankari to be used for the construction of college building and hostels. Thereafter, the Sangha appointed Dr M Basavaraju, professor of Physiology as the principal on 1 January 1981 and other staff by March 1981 and classes were started regularly from 16 March 1981. Since then 16 March is observed every year as KIMS Day.

The Silver Jubilee Celebrations of the institute was held in 2006. A college building to mark the centenary celebrations of the Vokkaligara Sangha and the Silver Jubilee of KIMS has been built at the Banashankari Campus.

Courses

Undergraduate
The college offers the 5-year MBBS course. Admission is through the NATIONAL ELIGIBILITY AND ENTRANCE TEST (NEET-UG) only. Management quota seats are also available .

Postgraduate
The postgraduate degree course is of three-years duration and the postgraduates diploma course two years. The college offers the following:

MD

Anatomy
Physiology
Biochemistry
Pharmacology
Pathology
Microbiology
Forensic Medicine
Community Medicine
Medicine
Paediatrics
Dermatology
Radio Diagnosis
Anaesthesiology
Psychiatry

MS

General Surgery
O.B.G
Ophthalmology
E.N.T
Orthopaedics

Diploma

DA (Anaesthesiology)
DCP(Pathology)
DCH(Paediatrics)
DGO (O.B.G)
DOMS (Ophthalmology)
D.Ortho. (Orthopaedics)
D.L.O (E.N.T)
DMRD (Radio Diagnosis)

These courses are recognised by Medical Council of India (M.C.I) and Government of India.

Campus
The college has two campuses. The hospital and clinical departments are on the VV Puram campus while the pre-clinical and para-clinical departments are on the Banashankari campus. Transport between the campuses is provided.

Facilities

Hostels
There are two hostels, one for each gender, on the Banashankari campus.

Sports
The college has a fully equipped health club with a 10 station multi-gym, two treadmills and steppers and a trained instructor. Indoor games like chess, carrom and table tennis are available.

The college has three intracollegiate sports fests. They are the KPL (KIMS Premiere League)(cricket), KVL(KIMS VOLLEYBALL LEAGUE) and Dinamani Cup (football).

Cultural activities
The college day, Atharva, allows the students to exhibit their talent in activities such as music, dance, mad ad, etc.

The intercollegiate quiz competition, Uttunga, is conducted by the college.

Achievements
KIMS has been ranked No. 24 among the 275+ medical colleges in India by The MINT, The Wall Street Journal.

References

External links
 

Medical colleges in Karnataka
Medical Council of India
Colleges in Bangalore
Colleges affiliated to Rajiv Gandhi University of Health Sciences